Alijan Ibragimov (also known as Alidjan or Alidzhon Ibragimov; 5 June 1953 – 3 February 2021) was a Kazakh oligarch of the Uyghur descent. He was born in Fergana, Uzbek SSR, and was a member of a well-known circle of oligarchs in Kazakhstan known as the "Trio."  The "Trio" comprises Ibragimov and his business partners, Alexander Mashkevich and Patokh Chodiev, active in the mining, oil & gas, and banking sectors in Kazakhstan. At the time of his death Ibragimov had dropped off of Forbes’ list of world billionaires.

With his partners Chodiev and Mashkevich, Ibragimov was a major shareholder in Eurasian National Resources Corporation (ENRC), now one of the world's leading natural resources groups. ENRC, based in London, operates a number of metals assets in Kazakhstan and Africa, having acquired numerous mining operations in Eastern Europe and Africa.  In 2009, ENRC generated a $1,462 million profit on sales of $13.8 billion.

ENRC was floated on the London Stock Exchange in December 2007, with a market capitalisation on Admission of approximately £60.8 billion.

Assets 
According to Forbes magazine in March 2019, Alidzhan Ibragimov's personal fortune was estimated at $2.3 billion.

In 2007, he made $800 million in profit from his businesses. "In 418th place is 58-year-old Alijan Ibragimov with a fortune of $2.8 billion" in 2012, according to Forbes magazine.

As of October 2020, the value of Alidzhan Ibragimov's assets was $900 million, making him the fourth-richest person in the Republic of Kazakhstan according to Forbes.

He died from COVID-19 in Belgium on 3 February 2021, at age 67.

References

External links
forbes.com
pqasb.pqarchiver.com Wall Street Journal
registration.ft.com  
russianlondon.com
jamestown.org
cacianalyst.org
nobribes.org

1953 births
2021 deaths
People from Fergana
Kazakhstani businesspeople
Kazakhstani people of Uyghur descent
Eurasian Natural Resources Corporation
Kazakhstani billionaires
State University of Management alumni
Deaths from the COVID-19 pandemic in Belgium